Inspired by Boaty McBoatface, other organizations have followed suit in naming vehicles in that style through a public naming poll. Many, but not all follow the formula of Namey McNameface.

Spoofs

A wide range of companies or organizations have renamed items or items in their business. This includes:
 A beer: The British television presenter and farmer Jeremy Clarkson revealed he planned to call a beer made from ingredients grown on his farm as "Lager McLagerface" (which would then be shortened to "McFace"). This was rejected by the advertising executive who said it did not give a premium image so the beer was named Hawkstone Lager instead.
 A bookmobile: The mobile library for Orkney Library and Archive is called "Booky McBookface." It is a bright blue bus which is ferried from island to island to bring books to rural and remote areas.
 A horse:  Sydney's Warwick Farm Racecourse named their new racehorse Horsey McHorseface in 2016.  Horsey McHorseface was put to auction and sold for $17,325, but in 2017 was euthanised due to bone disease.
 A train:  Swedish rail transport company MTRX conducted an online poll soon after the one involving Boaty McBoatface, to name a new train on the Stockholm to Gothenburg line.  Trainy McTrainface won the poll with 49% of the vote, and the train was named accordingly.  
 A ferry: Sydney Ferries allowed the public to name its fleet of Emerald-class ferries through a naming competition.  It was announced that the most popular name was Boaty McBoatface but, as it had already been taken, the judges opted to go instead for the second-place choice, and one of the ferries was thus named Ferry McFerryface.  After the Maritime Union of Australia refused to crew the vessel in protest at the name, it entered service named Emerald 6, with a Ferry McFerryface sticker below the bridge.  
 A megabus: Megabus' United Kingdom operation hosted a Twitter poll in late 2017 to name some of their brand-new Plaxton Elite bodied Volvo B11RT inter-deck coaches.  Mega McMegaface won, and the name was applied to one of the vehicles.
 A bridge: in March 2017, the Isle of Wight Council, which operates the Cowes Floating Bridge (a chain ferry across the River Medina between Cowes and East Cowes), stated it was open to suggestions from residents for a new name for the vessel, after originally registering it as Floating Bridge no. 6. Despite council officials ruling out Floaty McFloatface as a name, a petition was later created to name the vessel Floaty McFloatface, attracting over 2,000 signatures, and even caused the council to rescind its decision to veto the name.
 A sluice gate: In November 2020, the Dutch municipality of IJmuiden refused to name the new sluice lock Sluice McSluiceface or Sluisje McSluisface in Dutch. The name eventually chosen was Zeesluis IJmuiden (Sea Sluice IJmuiden).
 A snow plow: In February 2021, the Minnesota Department of Transportation arranged a contest to name a new fleet of snowplows. Out of the fifty finalists selected from about 24,000 entries, Plowy McPlowface was the top of the eight winners of a public poll, receiving support of over half of the voting pool, and was assigned to the Metro District's new snowplow.
 A skate park: In June 2019, Southend-on-Sea Borough Council named a skate park Skatey McSkateface after a public vote.
 A satellite terminal: The U.S. space launch provider and satellite operator firm SpaceX has named the terminal used to receive internet signals from its Starlink constellation of low-Earth orbiting satellites Dishy McFlatface.
 A stock car race: Busch Beer held a contest to name one of the two races it sponsored for the 2021 NASCAR Cup Series, held at Kansas Speedway on May 2. The winning name chosen was 2021 Buschy McBusch Race 400, with the race itself coincidentally won by NASCAR driver Kyle Busch.
 A howitzer: Center of Assistance to the Army, Veterans and Their Families, an NGO in Ukraine, held a twitter voting contest to name an M777 howitzer on the 18th of August of 2022. At the time of the contest, the howitzer was in use by the Armed Forces of Ukraine during the 2022 Russian invasion of Ukraine. The name was inscribed on the gun barrel. The winning name chosen was Cannon McCannonface.

Similar polling strategy 
In December 2016, after an online poll for children, Oldham Council chose to name one of their new gritter trucks (salt truck) Nicole Saltslinger following more than 5,000 entries. In November 2017, following public submissions, Doncaster Council announced the names for two new additional gritter trucks to their fleet; namely Gritsy Bitsy Teeny Weeny Yellow Anti-Slip Machiney (with 52.6% of the vote), and David Plowie (47.4% of the vote). This follows its five previously named gritters: Brad Grit, Gritney Spears, The Subzero Hero, Mr. Plow, and Usain Salt. The following year, in October 2018, Shropshire Council followed the similar theme, and named one of its gritter trucks Gritty McGritface after a public vote. Many other local authorities in Britain have also asked the public for name suggestions for their winter maintenance fleet.

References

Lists of names